Stephen Globus is a New York City venture capitalist who is third generation from a prominent banking family.  He is currently a founder and director of China Biopharmaceuticals Holdings, which is a major medical company in China.  He was a founding shareholder of  Genitope Corporation which is a San Francisco-area biotechnology company that designs custom treatments for cancer, including a vaccine to treat lymphoma.

Globus also was founder and chairman of PlasmaCo which developed color plasma television and sold to Osaka based  Matsushita (Panasonic) in 1996.  Globus was on the Japanese Board of Directors for the proceeding 7 years after the sale. His other ventures activities include key investment or managerial roles in Proscure (sold to Repligen), ExSar, Kimeragen which sold to a Paris-based company whose board Globus served on, Energy Research  (Fuel Cell Energy), Nematron, and Tinsley Laboratories  which developed the optic correction for Hubble Space Telescope now a division of the Dutch company ASML.

Globus holds patents on panoramic cameras called the Globuscope and  optics. Globus is a founder of  Globus Studios  in Central  Manhattan.  He is patron of the arts with associations such as Japan Society of New York and China Institute in America.

References

American businesspeople
Living people
Year of birth missing (living people)